The prime minister of Canada is an official who serves as the primary minister of the Crown, chair of the Cabinet, and thus head of government of Canada. Twenty-three people have served as prime ministers. Officially, the prime minister is appointed by the governor general of Canada, but by constitutional convention, the prime minister must have the confidence of the elected House of Commons. Normally, this is the leader of the party caucus with the greatest number of seats in the house. But if that leader lacks the support of the majority, the governor general can appoint another leader who has that support or may dissolve parliament and call a new election. By constitutional convention, a prime minister holds a seat in parliament and, since the early 20th century, this has more specifically meant the House of Commons.

Model
The office is not outlined in any of the documents that constitute the written portion of the Constitution of Canada; executive authority is formally vested in the sovereign and exercised on their behalf by the governor general. The prime ministership is part of Canada's constitutional convention tradition. The office was modelled after that which existed in the United Kingdom at the time. John A. Macdonald was commissioned by the Viscount Monck on 24 May 1867, to form the first government of the Canadian Confederation. On 1 July 1867, the first ministry assumed office.

Term
The prime minister begins their term has been determined by the date  sworn into their portfolio, as an oath of office as prime minister is not required. However, since 1957, the incoming prime minister has sworn an oath as prime minister. Before 1920, prime ministers' resignations were accepted immediately by the governor general and the last day of the ministries were the date he died or the date of resignation. Since 1920, the outgoing prime minister has only formally resigned when the new government is ready to be formed. The Interpretation Act of 1967 states that "where an appointment is made effective or terminates on a specified day, that appointment is considered to be effective or to terminate after the end of the previous day". Thus, although the outgoing prime minister formally resigns only hours before the incoming ministry swears their oaths, both during the day, the ministries are effectively changed at midnight the night before. Some sources, including the Parliament of Canada, apply this convention as far back as 1917. Two prime ministers have died in office: John A. Macdonald (1867–1873, 1878–1891), and John Thompson (1892–1894). All others have resigned, either after losing an election or upon retirement.

Prime ministers

Canadian custom is to count by the individuals who were prime minister, not by terms. Since Confederation, 23 prime ministers have been "called upon" by the governor general to form 29 Canadian Ministries.

See also

 Fathers of Confederation
 Historical rankings of prime ministers of Canada
 List of joint premiers of the Province of Canada
 Leader of the Official Opposition (Canada)
 List of Canadian federal parliaments
 List of Canadian monarchs
Spouse of the prime minister of Canada

References

Further reading

External links

Prime Minister's Official Site – Government of Canada
The Prime Ministers of Canada – The Historica Dominion Institute
Prime Ministers of Canada – Library of Parliament
Prime Ministers – Canada History

 

Prime Ministres
Prime Ministers
Prime Ministers